The women's high jump event at the 2019 Summer Universiade was held on 11 and 13 July at the Stadio San Paolo in Naples.

Medalists

Results

Qualification
Qualification: 1.91 m (Q) or at least 12 best (q) qualified for the final.

Final

References

High
2019